Katherine Jones may refer to:

 Katherine Jones, Viscountess Ranelagh (1615–1691), Irish scientist and also a political and religious philosopher
 Katherine Jones (academic), professor of regulatory biology
 Katherine Davies Jones (1860–1943), American botanist

See also 
 Catherine Zeta-Jones (born 1969), Welsh actress